A professional conference organiser, professional congress organiser (PCO) or conference company is a company which specialises in the organisation and management of congresses, conferences, seminars and similar events.

Role
PCOs can typically work as consultants for academic and professional associations. They usually provide full service management for conferences including conference design, abstract management software, program development, registration, site and venue selection and booking, audiovisuals, IT support, logistics, leisure management, marketing, printing and web services, sourcing speakers, funding,  sponsorship and exhibitor sales, financial management and budget control.

Other companies offer related services including travel agents and public relations companies. They tend to focus on limited areas such as destination management.

Size of market sector
Surveys of UK conference venues have found that a third of conference bookings were made by PCOs or venue-finding agencies. In 2006 UK-based conferences generated £7.6 billion in direct sales giving PCOs a central role in some £2.5 billion of revenue generation. The UK is ranked second behind the US for global market share of conferences. Thus, although there is no one source of global statistics for the conference market it appears that PCOs play a central role in several billion dollars' worth of revenue generation worldwide.

See also
 Event planning
 Meeting and convention planner
 Meetings, incentives, conferencing, exhibitions

References

External links
 IAPCO – the International Association of PCOs
 ICCA - International Congress and Convention Association
  Association of British Professional Conference Organisers (ABPCO)
 Meeting Professionals International (white papers about the meetings industry)
 – Professional Convention Management Association (PCMA)

Business conferences
Professionalism